Reed DeMordaunt (born October 1, 1963 in Rochester, Minnesota) is a former Republican Idaho State Representative representing District 14 in the B seat from 2010 to 2016. He chose not to run for re-election to focus on his business, Med Management Technology. He was succeeded by his wife Gayann DeMordaunt.

Education
DeMordaunt earned his bachelor's degree from Brigham Young University and master's degrees from the University of South Carolina and American University in Cairo.

Elections

References

External links
Campaign Website

1963 births
Living people
The American University in Cairo alumni
Brigham Young University alumni
Republican Party members of the Idaho House of Representatives
People from Eagle, Idaho
Politicians from Rochester, Minnesota
University of South Carolina alumni
American expatriates in Egypt
Latter Day Saints from Minnesota
21st-century American politicians
Latter Day Saints from Idaho
Latter Day Saints from South Carolina